Tesana Panvisvas (เทศนา พันธ์วิศวาส; born 14 March 1978) is a male badminton player from Thailand. He competed at the 2000 and 2004 Olympic Games. In 2002 Asian Games, and won the men's doubles silver with Pramote Teerawiwatana. 
 He and Teerawiwatana also won the men's doubles gold at the 1999 Southeast Asian Games.

Career
Panvisvas started playing badminton at the age of 12, and then he represented his country at the 1998 Asian Games. Together with Pramote Teerawiwatana in the men's doubles event, they competed at the 2000 Summer Olympics. In the first round, they had beaten the Dutch pair, Dennis Lens and Quinten van Dalm, and defeated by Choong Tan Fook and Lee Wan Wah in the second round. In 2004, they defeated Ashley Brehaut and Travis Denney of Australia in the first round, then were defeated in the round of 16 by Choong Tan Fook and Lee Wan Wah of Malaysia.

Achievements

Asian Games 
Men's doubles

Asian Championships 
Men's doubles

Southeast Asian Games 
Men's doubles

IBF World Grand Prix 
The World Badminton Grand Prix sanctioned by International Badminton Federation (IBF) from 1983 to 2006.

Men's doubles

References 

1978 births
Living people
Tesana Panvisvas
Badminton players at the 2000 Summer Olympics
Badminton players at the 2004 Summer Olympics
Tesana Panvisvas
Badminton players at the 1998 Asian Games
Badminton players at the 2002 Asian Games
Tesana Panvisvas
Asian Games medalists in badminton
Medalists at the 2002 Asian Games
Competitors at the 1999 Southeast Asian Games
Competitors at the 2001 Southeast Asian Games
Competitors at the 2003 Southeast Asian Games
Competitors at the 2007 Southeast Asian Games
Tesana Panvisvas
Tesana Panvisvas
Tesana Panvisvas
Southeast Asian Games medalists in badminton
Badminton coaches
World No. 1 badminton players